The 1867 Belmont Stakes was the first running of the Belmont Stakes. It was held on June 19, 1867, at Jerome Park Racetrack in Fordham, Westchester County -- now part of The Bronx.

In a field of four horses, the only filly that entered, Ruthless, won the inaugural event by a head over second place DeCourcey. Instead of having to carry 110 pounds like the other three horses, Ruthless only had to carry 107. For winning, Ruthless's owners received $1,850.

Ruthless was the first of only three fillies to win the Belmont Stakes. The other two are Tanya (1905) and Rags to Riches (2007).

Results

References

Jerome Park Racetrack
Belmont Stakes races
Belmont Stakes
Belmont Stakes
Belmont Stakes
Jerome Park, Bronx
Horse races in New York City